Pavlos Kanellakis (born 3 May 1939) is a Greek sports shooter. He competed in the mixed skeet event at the 1976 Summer Olympics.

References

1939 births
Living people
Greek male sport shooters
Olympic shooters of Greece
Shooters at the 1976 Summer Olympics
Sportspeople from Thessaloniki
20th-century Greek people